Watersfield is a hamlet in the Horsham District of West Sussex, England. It lies on the A29 road 3.1 miles (5 km) southwest of Pulborough. At the 2011 Census the population of the Hamlet was included in the civil parish of Coldwaltham. 

Horsham District
Villages in West Sussex